Jacob Byron Ludington (born ) is the American author of Easy Digital Home Movies and founder of tech help site MediaBlab.

Biography 
Ludington was born in Des Moines, Iowa. He majored in Marketing at the Iowa State University. He married Robin Amrine on June 6, 2004. Jake currently lives in Bainbridge Island, Washington.

Projects 
Jake Ludington publishes how-to articles for his Jake Ludington's Digital Lifestyle publication, with over 2,000 articles and 29,000 readers as of July 1, 2009.

Jake Ludington co-produced a video with Brandon Wirtz demonstrating how to play Xbox 360 games while in a moving car which was featured on MTV Obsessed

Jake Ludington was co-organizer of the first 3 Gnomedex events and past business partner of Chris Pirillo. Ludington has contributed articles to Popular Science, PC Today, and O'Reilly.

Bibliography
Easy Digital Home Movies (2004), Que Publishing

References

External links 
 Jake Ludington's official blog
 Jake's Youtube Channel
  Jake's Twitter Account
 Gnomedex Website

1973 births
Living people
American bloggers
Writers from Des Moines, Iowa
Writers from Seattle
21st-century American non-fiction writers